The Queensland Rugby Football League  (QRL) is the governing body for rugby league in Queensland. It is a member of the Australian Rugby League Commission (ARL Commission) and selects the members of the Queensland rugby league team.

The QRL aims to "foster, develop, extend, govern and control Rugby League Football throughout the State of Queensland". Today the QRL administers the rugby league through its regional divisions. It is also responsible for the Queensland Rugby League team. The QRL's headquarters are on Vulture Street, Woolloongabba in Brisbane.

History of the QRL

The Queensland Rugby Football League was formed in 1908 by seven rugby players who were dissatisfied with the administration of the Queensland Rugby Union (QRU) as the Queensland Rugby Association. Those founding fathers were Micky Dore, George Watson, Jack Fihelly, J O'Connor. E Buchanan, Alf Faulkner and Sine Boland.  Discussion about breaking away from the rugby 'union' and forming a professional 'league' in Queensland can be traced as far back as 1905 through the visions of then Deputy State Premier, Michael Allison.

On 14 March 1908, the breakaway group was first mentioned in the local media, and a fortnight later the first official announcement was made regarding the formation of the Queensland Rugby Association was made. On 16 May that year a hastily assembled Queensland team played the touring New Zealand "All Golds" side in Brisbane. Later that month there were three representative games against New South Wales, which acted as selection trials for a national team.

In 1909, club rugby league officially began, with W. Evans scoring the inaugural try before backing up with another as North Brisbane beat Toombul 8-0 at the Brisbane Cricket Ground, although Valleys were the first premiers. Other teams that entered the competition include: Milton (1909), South Brisbane (1909), West End (1910), Natives (1912), Merthyr (1917) and  Coorparoo (1917).

In 2012, the QRL formally joined with the NSWRL and each National Rugby League club, to form the Australian Rugby League Commission, which is the overarching governing body for all of Rugby League throughout Australia. Notwithstanding the Commission's role as supreme governing authority for the code, the QRL retains responsibility for both management of the Queensland State of Origin team in Origin series, as well as day-to-day accountability for the operations of the Queensland Cup second-tier league, and junior representative Rugby League, plus divisional leagues, throughout Queensland.

Current Major Competitions

Intrust Super Cup

The Queensland Cup has been contested since 1996. Since 1998 the team winning the Queensland Cup is considered to be the premier club team in Queensland.

FOGS Cup

The Brisbane A-Grade Rugby League, also known as the FOGS Cup, and the FOGS Colts Challenge is run by the Queensland Rugby League's South East Division. It is regarded as the division below the Queensland Cup.

Mal Meninga Cup

The Cyril Connell & Mal Meninga Cups were introduced in 2009 to provide a pathway for young rugby league players to reach the professional levels of the game. Named after famous Queensland rugby league personalities Cyril Connell and Mal Meninga, the Cups have proved popular. Both competitions have the same structure of sixteen team split into two geographically aligned groups. Pool A contains teams from outside of Brisbane while Pool B comprises teams from the Brisbane metropolitan area and two Gold Coast Rugby League selections. The Cyril Connell Cup was discontinued after 2016.

The teams are:

47th Battalion Shield 
Like the Northern Division's "Foley Shield" or the South-East Division's "Bulimba Cup" the "47th Battalion Shield" is run as the Central Region's regional Carnival and none of the teams are club teams, with the only exception being some of the Women's teams. Its traditionally held over one weekend and normally at one venue with multiple grounds to play on.

The Foley Shield

The Foley Shield competition began in North Queensland in 1948. With the introduction of the Queensland Cup in 1996 the Foley Shield competition was scrapped, only to be reintroduced in 2000. Since the revamp in 2000 it has only contested by the three largest cities in North Queensland; Cairns, Mackay and Townsville.

Former

Brisbane Rugby League Premiership 

The Brisbane Rugby League Premiership was a former top-flight rugby league competition. The competition ran fom 1922 until 1997, but became a second tier competition with the advent of the ARL Premiership in 1995.

Bulimba Cup 

The Bulimba Cup was similar to the Foley Shield in that it was contested by city representative sides in a region, this time the South East Region, with the teams being Brisbane, Ipswich and Toowoomba.

QRL Divisions

The QRL administers rugby league in Queensland through the following divisions.
 As of 2010 the Central, South West and Wide Bay divisions were amalgamated to form the new Central Division.

Central Queensland Capras

 Central Highlands Rugby League
 Central West Rugby League
 Gladstone & District Rugby League
 Rockhampton & District Rugby League

South West Queensland Mustangs 

 Roma District Rugby League
 Toowoomba Rugby League
 Border Rivers Rugby League

Defunct Competitions 

 Western Rugby League

Wide Bay Bulls 

 Bundaberg Rugby League
 Central Burnett Rugby League
 Northern Districts Rugby League
 South Burnett Rugby League
 Sunshine Coast Rugby League

North Queensland Marlins

 Cairns District Rugby League
 Mackay & District Rugby League
 Mount Isa Rugby League
 Remote Areas Rugby League
 Townsville & District Rugby League

Defunct Competitions 
 Mid West Rugby League
 Northern Peninsula Area Rugby League

South East Poinsettias

 Brisbane Second Division Rugby League The Poinsettias / The Stingers (Juniors)
 Gold Coast Rugby League (The Vikings)
 Ipswich Rugby League (The Diggers)

Seasons
 1908 Queensland Rugby League season
 1909 Queensland Rugby League season
 1910 Queensland Rugby League season
 1911 Queensland Rugby League season

See also

 Rugby league in Queensland
 Australian Rugby League
 Queensland Rugby League team

References

In-line

General

External links

 League's Queensland page
 Queensland Rugby League History
 Rugby League clubs in Queensland
 Queensland Masters Rugby League Association inc

 
Rugby league governing bodies in Queensland
Ru
Rugby league in Queensland
1908 establishments in Australia
Sports leagues established in 1908